Hartline may refer to:

 Hartline, Washington, town, United States
 HARTline, the brand name for Hillsborough Area Regional Transit, Florida, United States

People with the surname
 Beverly Karplus Hartline, American physicist
 Brian Hartline, American football wide receiver
 Haldan Keffer Hartline, American Nobel Prize in Physiology or Medicine winner
 Mary Hartline, American actress
 Mike Hartline, American football quarterback